Lafayette Escadrille, also known as C'est la Guerre, Hell Bent for Glory (UK) and With You in My Arms, is a 1958 American war film produced by Warner Bros. It stars Tab Hunter and Etchika Choureau and features David Janssen and Will Hutchins, as well as Clint Eastwood, in an early supporting role. It was the final film in the career of director William A. Wellman and is based on his original story.

Plot
Thad Walker (Tab Hunter), a spoiled, rich kid from Boston, who had gotten in serious trouble with the law, fled to France to join the French Foreign Legion in World War I. In Paris, with companions, "Duke" Sinclair (David Janssen), Dave Putnam (Will Hutchins), Tom Hitchcock (Jody McCrea) and Bill Wellman (William Wellman Jr.), the boys stop at a bar and learn of the recent formation of the Lafayette Escadrille made up of American volunteer pilots who fly for France. The group of expatriates join up and learn to fly on training aircraft before becoming combat pilots.

While off duty, Walker meets and falls in love with Renée Beaulieu (Etchika Choureau), a common streetwalker with some sensitivity; she quits the oldest profession and takes a job, reforming for her American lover's sake. Walker's father beat him, and he resents any kind of authority. When a strutting, arrogant French officer (Marcel Dalio), irritated by the young man's inability to understand commands in French, strikes him, he knocks the officer to the ground, a very serious offense. Before he can be jailed, his pals smuggle Walker out of camp.  He then spends a great deal of time hiding in Paris in his sweetheart's apartment. His friends continue with their training while Walker works for the Madam (Veola Vonn), hoping to make enough money to run away to South America with his girlfriend.

Later, the now veteran pilots he had befriended come to the bar and Walker realizes he still wants to redeem himself. Convincing an American general that he is sincere, when the United States enters the war, he joins the American Air Service.  Walker finally is able to fly a mission with the Lafayette Escadrille, where he proves to be a superb fighter pilot. Returning to Paris, Walker asks his friends to join him as he weds Renée.

Cast

 Tab Hunter as Thad Walker
 Etchika Choureau as Renée Beaulieu
 Marcel Dalio as Drill Sergeant
 David Janssen as "Duke" Sinclair
 Paul Fix as U.S. General
 Veola Vonn as The Madam
 Will Hutchins as Dave Putnam
 Clint Eastwood as George Moseley
 Robert Hover as Dave Judd
 Tom Laughlin as Arthur Blumenthal
 Brett Halsey as Frank Baylies
 Henry Nakamura as Jimmy
 Maurice Marsac as Sgt. Parris
 Raymond Bailey as Amos J. Walker
 William Wellman Jr. as Bill/William A. Wellman
 Jody McCrea as Tom Hitchcock
 Denny Devine as Lawrence "Red" Scanlan
 Ralph Guldahl as Dudley Tucker
 Sam Boghosian as Booth

Cast notes:
 The roles of "Duke" Sinclair (Reginald "Duke" Sinclaire), Dave Judd (Edward David Judd), Arthur Blumenthal and Frank Baylies (Frank Leamon Baylies) were also based by Wellman on actual members of the Escadrille
 Craig Hill's uncredited role as Lufberry, based on  Raoul Gervais Lufbery, is essentially a walk-on role.

Production

Relying on his own World War I service, Wellman wrote the original story, based on the actual exploits of a friend from the war years. Earning himself the nickname "Wild Bill", Wellman was first an ambulance driver in the Norton-Harjes Ambulance Corps, then joined the French Foreign Legion. On December 3, 1917, assigned as the first American fighter pilot to join N.87 escadrille in the Lafayette Flying Corps, Wellman went on to score three recorded "kills", along with five probables and to receive the Croix de Guerre with two palms.

Although he considered Lafayette Escadrille a "personal project", the studio did not give Wellman the budget he demanded and continued to interfere with the project, to the extent that the decisions on starring roles, title, ending and other important aspects of the production were taken out of his hands, including the title of the film: Wellman's original title was C'est la Guerre which the studio, despite his objections, changed to Lafayette Escadrille.  In casting, Wellman wanted Paul Newman and Clint Eastwood as the leads; studio head Jack L. Warner refused, and substituted teen idol Tab Hunter and David Janssen, with Eastwood moved to a minor role. Warner also insisted Wellman make Darby's Rangers as a condition of financing Lafayette Escadrille.

The use of mocked-up Nieuport 28 and Thomas-Morse Scout fighters along with other period aircraft such as one real Fokker D.VII and the ubiquitous Travelair "Wichita Fokkers" were "lifted" from Wellman's earlier 1938 production, Men with Wings, an early color feature also directed by Wellman. Principal photography took place primarily at the Hancock Santa Maria, California airport. Hollywood stunt pilot Paul Mantz, built a number of Blériot XI "Penguin" clipped-wing and full span training aircraft, used in the training sequences.

According to information in the Warner Bros. Archive, the original script—with the tragic ending in which Walker dies in combat and Renée  commits suicide—was written by Paul Fix. A later script, dated October 1956  and attributed to A. Fleischman (with story credit to Wellman) has the happy ending. Shooting took place October 19 to December 8, 1956.

Reception

In the original cut of the film Tab Hunter's character died at the end. However this was poorly received at previews and a new ending was shot in April–May 1957 where he lived.

While the aviation scenes in Lafayette Escadrille were well received (William Clothier filmed the spectacular aerial sequences, evocative of those he shot in Wellman's earlier silent classic Wings), critics said the film falls far short of the classic status of the 1928 Oscar winner. The flying sequences were not enough to overcome a mediocre story and flat acting, aspects roundly panned by critics. Howard Thompson, reviewer for The New York Times called it a "flapdoodle" in his blistering review.Variety echoed other reviews, noting, "What could have been an reasonably good actioneer ... has been badly marred by a flat predictability in plot, intrusion of an inept and, at times, ludicrously irrelevant romance and some quite dreadful dialog.The Lafayette Escadrille  was also totally disowned by those still alive who had flown as part of the fabled Lafayette Escadrille and the Lafayette Flying Corps, who were understandably upset at their portrayal, including Wellman who insisted that his producer's credit be removed. This was to be William Wellman's last directorial effort; it had started out to be a paean to his memories of the storied squadron, but ended up a target for insults, accusations and lawsuits, not the least of which were directed against Jack Warner and Warner Brothers Studios for their heavy-handed interference. The film was shelved for two years, partly because of the wrangling between the two Hollywood heavyweights. TCM.com reports that a modern source suggests that the delay was at least partly due to the studio’s hopes that Hunter would succeed as a singer. So a "pollyanna" ending grafted into the film. Wellman was "heartbroken" with his treatment at the hands of Jack L. Warner, and kept his word that Lafayette Escadrille would be his last film.

See also
 The Legion of the Condemned (1928)
 Flyboys (2006)

References
Explanatory notes

Citations

Bibliography

 Hardwick, Jack and Ed Schnepf. "A Viewer's Guide to Aviation Movies". The Making of the Great Aviation Films, General Aviation Series, Volume 2, 1989.
 Hunter, Tab and Eddie Muller. Tab Hunter Confidential: The Making of a Movie Star. New York: Algonquin Books, 2005. .
 Parish, James Robert. The Great Combat Pictures: Twentieth-Century Warfare on the Screen. Metuchen, New Jersey: The Scarecrow Press, 1990. .
 Silke, James R. "Fists, Dames & Wings." Air Progress Aviation Review, Volume 4, No. 4, October 1980.
 Thompson, Frank T. William A. Wellman (Filmmakers Series). Metuchen, New Jersey: Scarecrow Press, 1983. .
 Wellman, William A. Go, Get 'em! The True Adventures of an American Aviator of the Lafayette Flying Corps. Boston: The Page Company, 1918.
 Wellman, William A. A Short Time for Insanity: An Autobiography. New York: Hawthorn Books, 1974. .
 Wellman, William Jr. The Man And His Wings: William A. Wellman and the Making of the First Best Picture''. New York: Praeger Publishers, 2006. .

External links
 
 
 
 
 Lafayette Escadrille at Rotten Tomatoes

1958 films
1950s romance films
1958 war films
Warner Bros. films
American aviation films
World War I aviation films
American black-and-white films
War romance films
Films scored by Leonard Rosenman
Films about prostitution in France
Films set in Paris
Lafayette Escadrille
1950s English-language films
Films directed by William A. Wellman
1950s American films